Quality Chess UK Ltd (known as Quality Chess) is a chess publishing company, founded in 2004 by International Master Ari Ziegler, Grandmaster Jacob Aagaard and Grandmaster John Shaw. The company is based in Glasgow.

The company focuses on quality of publications rather than quantity of books. In 2005, the book Learn from the Legends: Chess Champions at Their Best by Grandmaster Mihail Marin won the ChessCafe.com "Book of the Year" award. In 2007 San Luis 2005: How Chess Found Its Champion by Alik Gershon and Igor Nor won the English Chess Federation's "Book of the Year 2007" award. Aagaard's Attacking Manual 1 & 2 won the 2010 English Chess Federation book of the year prize.

Published books
Marin, Mihail (2004). Learn from the Legends: Chess Champions at Their Best. Quality Chess. .
Rogozenko, Dorian (2005). Sveshnikov Reloaded. Quality Chess. ;
Aagaard, Jacob (2006). Practical Chess Defence. Quality Chess. .
Gershon, Alik; Nor, Igor (2006). San Luis 2005: How Chess Found Its Champion. Quality Chess. .
Marin, Mihail (2007). A Spanish Opening Repertoire for Black. Quality Chess. .
Marin, Mihail (2007). Beating the Open Games. Quality Chess. .
Vigorito, David (2007). Challenging the Nimzo-Indian. Quality Chess. .
Vigorito, David (2007). Play the Semi-Slav. Quality Chess. .
Nimzowitsch, Aron (2007). My System, .
Aagaard, Jacob (2008). The Attacking Manual: Basic Principles. Quality Chess. .

 Brunello, Sabino (2009). Attacking the Spanish. Quality Chess. .
Aagaard, Jacob (2010).The Attacking Manual 2: Technique and Praxis. Quality Chess. .
Boris Avrukh (2010) Grandmaster Repertoire 2 - 1.d4 volume 2. Quality Chess. .
Boris Alterman (2010)  The Alterman Gambit - White Gambits. Quality Chess. Guide .
Milos Pavlovic (2010) The Cutting Edge 1 - The Open Sicilian. Quality Chess. 1 .
Alexey Suetin (2010) Soviet Chess Strategy. Quality Chess. .
Lars Schandorff(2010) Grandmaster Repertoire 7 - The Caro-Kann. Quality Chess. .
John Shaw (2010) The Quality Chess Puzzle Book. Quality Chess. .
Ľubomír Ftáčnik (2010) Grandmaster Repertoire 6 - The Sicilian Defence. Quality Chess. .
Artur Yusupov (2010) Boost your Chess 2 - Beyond the Basics. Quality Chess. .
Mihail Marin (2010) Grandmaster Repertoire 4 - The English Opening vol. 2. Quality Chess. .
Mihail Marin  (2010) Grandmaster Repertoire 5 - The English Opening vol. 3. Quality Chess. .
Christian Bauer (2010) Play the Scandinavian. Quality Chess.  .
Artur Yusupov (2011) Boost your Chess 3 - Mastery. Quality Chess. .
Milos Pavlovic (2011) The Cutting Edge 2 - Sicilian Najdorf 6.Be3. Quality Chess. .
Jacob Aagaard & John Shaw (editors) (2011) Experts on the Anti-Sicilian. Quality Chess. .
Vladimir Popov (2011)  Chess Lessons. Quality Chess. .
Tibor Károlyi (2011) Karpov's Strategic Wins 2 - The Prime Years. Quality Chess. .
Tibor Károlyi (2011) Karpov's Strategic Wins 1 - The Making of a Champion. Quality Chess. .
Arkadij Naiditsch (2011) Chess Evolution. Quality Chess. .
Boris Avrukh (2011) Grandmaster Repertoire 8 - The Grunfeld Defence . Quality Chess. .
Vasilios Kotronias (2011) The Grandmaster Battle Manual. Quality Chess. .
Boris Avrukh (2011) Grandmaster Repertoire 9 - The Grunfeld Defence Volume Two. Quality Chess. .
Glenn Flear (2011) Tactimania. Quality Chess. .
Artur Yusupov (2011)  Chess Evolution 1. Quality Chess. .
Jacob Aagaard & John Shaw (editors) (2011) Grandmaster vs Amateur. Quality Chess. .
Boris Alterman (2011) The Alterman Gambit Guide - Black Gambits. Quality Chess. 1 .
Lev Psakhis (2011)  Advanced Chess Tactics. Quality Chess. .
Nikolaos Ntirlis and Jacob Aagaard (2011) Grandmaster Repertoire 10 - The Tarrasch Defence. Quality Chess.  .
Martin Weteschnik (2012) Chess Tactics from Scratch. Quality Chess. .
Mihai Suba (2012) Positional Chess Sacrifices. Quality Chess. .
Boris Alterman (2012) Alterman Gambit Guide - Black Gambits 2. Quality Chess. .
Artur Yusupov (2012)  Chess Evolution 2. Quality Chess. .
Jacob Aagaard (2012) Grandmaster Preparation - Calculation. Quality Chess. .
Marc Esserman (2012) Mayhem in the Morra. Quality Chess. .
Lars Schandorff (2012) Playing 1.d4 - The Queen's Gambit. Quality Chess. .
Lars Schandorff (2012)  Playing 1.d4 - The Indian Defences. Quality Chess. .
Judit Polgár (2012) How I Beat Fischer's Record (hardcover) - Judit Polgar Teaches Chess 1. Quality Chess. .
Boris Avrukh (2012)  Grandmaster Repertoire 11 - Beating 1.d4 Sidelines.  Quality Chess. .
Jacob Aagaard (2012) Grandmaster Preparation - Positional Play. Quality Chess. .
Artur Yusupov (2013)  Chess Evolution 3. Quality Chess. .
Victor Mikhalevski (2013) Grandmaster Repertoire 13 - The Open Spanish. Quality Chess. .
Marian Petrov (2013) Grandmaster Repertoire 12 - The Modern Benoni. Quality Chess. .
Peter Romanovsky (2013) Soviet Middlegame Technique. Quality Chess. .
Jacob Aagaard (2013) Grandmaster Preparation - Strategic Play. Quality Chess. .
John Shaw (2013) The King's Gambit. Quality Chess. .
Vasilios Kotronias (2013) Kotronias on the King's Indian Fianchetto Systems. Quality Chess. .
Richard Pert (2013) Playing the Trompowsky. Quality Chess. .
Axel Smith (2013) Pump Up Your Rating. Quality Chess. .
Emanuel Berg (2013) Grandmaster Repertoire 14 - The French Defence Volume One. Quality Chess. 
Jacob Aagaard and Nikolaos Ntirlis (2013) Playing the French. Quality Chess. .
Judit Polgár (2013) From GM to Top Ten. Quality Chess. .
Emanuel Berg (2013) Grandmaster Repertoire 15 - The French Defence Volume Two. Quality Chess. .
Vasilios Kotronias and Sotiris Logothetis (2013) Carlsen's Assault on the Throne. Quality Chess. .
Boris Avrukh (2014) Grandmaster Repertoire 17 - The Classical Slav. Quality Chess.  .
Tibor Károlyi (2014) Mikhail Tal's Best Games 1 - The Magic of Youth. Quality Chess. .
Daniel Gormally (2014) Mating the Castled King. Quality Chess. .
Jacob Aagaard  (2014) Grandmaster Preparation - Attack and Defence. Quality Chess. .
Jacob Aagaard  (2014) Grandmaster Preparation - Endgame Play. Quality Chess. .
Vasilios Kotronias (2014) Grandmaster Repertoire 18 - The Sicilian Sveshnikov. Quality Chess. .
Parimarjan Negi (2014) Grandmaster Repertoire - 1.e4 vs The French, Caro-Kann and Philidor. Quality Chess. .
Esben Lund (2014) The Secret Life of Bad Bishops. Quality Chess. .
Judit Polgár (2014) A Game of Queens. Quality Chess. .
Tiger Hillarp Persson (2014) The Modern Tiger. Quality Chess. .
Ilya Maizelis (2014)  The Soviet Chess Primer. Quality Chess. .

References

External links
 Company website
 Catalog of published books from the company
 Chess Scotland

Chess publishing companies
Chess in Scotland